Irakly "Ike" Kaveladze (Georgian: ირაკლი კაველაძე) is a Georgian-American business executive. He was one of eight people attending a meeting with Donald Trump's election campaign officials in June 2016. According to his attorney, Kavaladze is a long-time U.S. citizen and has "never had any engagement with the Russian government in any capacity."

Kaveladze was born in the Soviet republic of Georgia in 1965. He graduated from the Moscow Finance Academy in 1989 and received an MBA from the University of New Haven in Connecticut in 2002, according to his website. He immigrated to the US in 1991 where he set up International Business Creations (IBC), a company that opened bank accounts with Citibank of New York and the Commercial Bank of San Francisco for companies incorporated in Delaware for Russian brokers.  In 1996, Kaveladze set up Euro-American Corporate Services Inc. whose services included incorporating companies in Delaware for Russian brokers and setting up bank accounts for them.  A money laundering investigation in 2000 revealed that Kaveladze had created corporations without knowing who owned them and that more than $1.4 billion had been moved through their accounts. In response to a 2020 senate report that mentioned this investigation, a lawyer from the firm representing Kaveladze stated that it "does nothing more than reiterate decades-old claims of money laundering that have been consistently denied and debunked and which, despite extensive investigations, resulted in no finding of any illegality whatsoever."

On June 9, 2016, he was present at a meeting in Trump Tower between three people associated with the Donald Trump campaign—Donald Trump Jr., Jared Kushner, and Paul Manafort—and several other people including Russian attorney Natalia Veselnitskaya. The meeting had been proposed by Azerbaijani singer Emin Agalarov and his father, Moscow-based oligarch Aras Agalarov, Kaveladze's employer. Kaveladze attended the meeting as a representative of the Agalarov family and to serve as an interpreter if necessary, according to his attorney.

See also
Russian interference in the 2016 United States elections

References

American people of Georgian (country) descent
Living people
People associated with Russian interference in the 2016 United States elections
People associated with the 2016 United States presidential election
1965 births